The 2013 Asian Women's Youth Handball Championship (5th tournament) took place in Bangkok, Thailand from 7 September–15 September. It acts as the Asian qualifying tournament for the 2014 Women's Youth World Handball Championship.

Results

Final standing

References
www.handball.jp

External links
www.asianhandball.com

International handball competitions hosted by Thailand
Asian Women's Youth Handball Championship, 2013
Asia
Asian Handball Championships